Nothophacidium is a genus of fungi in the family Dermateaceae.

See also
 List of Dermateaceae genera

References

External links
Nothophacidium at Index Fungorum

Dermateaceae genera